Proceratophrys palustris is a species of frog in the family Odontophrynidae.
It is endemic to Brazil.
Its natural habitats are subtropical or tropical moist montane forest, subtropical or tropical dry lowland grassland, and intermittent rivers.
It is threatened by habitat loss.

References

Proceratophrys
Endemic fauna of Brazil
Amphibians of Brazil
Taxonomy articles created by Polbot
Amphibians described in 1993